Charles Perez (born March 2, 1963) is an American writer and television news reporter, anchor and talk show host.

Career
Perez was in the news business in the 1990s through the 2000s, during which he anchored and reported for WABC-TV in New York City; WPLG, the ABC television affiliate in Miami, Florida; and WSVN, the Fox television affiliate in Miami. Before that, Perez was known as host of the nationally syndicated The Charles Perez Show. The show was produced by Tribune Entertainment and ran from 1994 until 1996.

Following that, he anchored King World's nationally syndicated news magazine show, American Journal, along with his sister, Michele Dabney-Perez, during its final season, replacing Nancy Glass. Perez has also worked as a reporter for the Los Angeles station KCAL-TV, as a producer of The Ricki Lake Show and The Montel Williams Show.

Perez was the main evening anchor at Miami's ABC affiliate WPLG. He was terminated from this position on August 6, 2009, after he filed a discrimination complaint against the station, regarding supposed prejudice over what his attorney cited as the increasing public awareness of his sexual orientation that resulted in his being removed from anchoring Channel 10's weeknight newscasts. Previously he was a weekday reporter and the weekend anchor at WABC-TV in New York City until 2006. He co-anchored the 6 p.m. and 11 p.m. weekend editions of Eyewitness News with Sandra Bookman.

Perez made an appearance during the first season of MTV's The Real World when he appeared on-camera as one-half of a couple with Norman Korpi. According to Perez, the two were never linked in a relationship, though the MTV producers portrayed them as if they were.

Perez's autobiography, Confessions of a Gay Anchorman, was published in 2011.

Perez is currently employed as a reporter by WLOS in Asheville, North Carolina.

Personal life
Perez was involved in a legal battle with his ex-partner. Perez alleges negative publicity from his legal battle led WPLG to demote him.

In September 2009, Perez married his partner, Keith Rinehard, in Westport, Connecticut. They adopted a daughter.

See also

 List of American writers
 List of people from Los Angeles
 List of people from Miami
 List of people from New York City
 List of talk show hosts

References

External links
 

1963 births
American television talk show hosts
Journalists from California
American LGBT broadcasters
American LGBT journalists
LGBT memoirists
LGBT people from California
LGBT people from Florida
LGBT people from New York (state)
LGBT producers
Living people
Television anchors from Miami
Television anchors from New York City
Television producers from California
Television producers from New York City
21st-century LGBT people